The men's 55 kg competition at the 2018 World Weightlifting Championships was held on 1–2 November 2018.

Schedule

Medalists

Records

Results

New records

References

External links
Results 
Results Group A
Results Group B

Men's 55 kg